The 1886–87 United States Senate elections were held on various dates in various states. As these U.S. Senate elections were prior to the ratification of the Seventeenth Amendment in 1913, senators were chosen by state legislatures. Senators were elected over a wide range of time throughout 1886 and 1887, and a seat may have been filled months late or remained vacant due to legislative deadlock. In these elections, terms were up for the senators in Class 1.

The Republican Party lost two seats.  At the beginning of the 50th Congress, therefore, Republicans had the slimmest possible majority due to a vacant Democratic seat: 38 out of 75 seats.  Once that vacancy was filled, Republicans maintained control as the single Readjuster senator caucused with them.

Results summary

Colored shading indicates party with largest share of that row.

Change in composition

Before the elections 
After August 4, 1886 special election in California.

After the elections

At the beginning of the first session, December 7, 1887

Race summaries

Elections during the 49th Congress 
In these elections, the winners were seated during 1886 or in 1887 before March 4; ordered by election date.

Races leading to the 50th Congress 
In these regular elections, the winners were elected for the term beginning March 4, 1887; ordered by state.

All of the elections involved the Class 1 seats.

Elections during the 50th Congress 
In these elections, the winners were elected in 1887 after March 4; ordered by date.

Maryland 

Arthur Pue Gorman won re-election for an unknown margin of votes for the Class 1 seat.

New York 

The election in New York was held from January 18 to 20, 1887.  Republican Warner Miller had been elected to this seat in a special election in 1881 to succeed Thomas C. Platt who had resigned. Miller's term would expire on March 3, 1887. At the State election in November 1885, 20 Republicans and 12 Democrats were elected for a two-year term (1886-1887) in the State Senate. At the State election in November 1886, 74 Republicans and 54 Democrats were elected for the session of 1887 to the Assembly. The 110th New York State Legislature met from January 4 to May 26, 1887, at Albany, New York.

The caucus of Republican State legislators met on January 17, President pro tempore of the State Senate Edmund L. Pitts presided. 20 State senators and 71 assemblymen attended. Ex-Speaker of the Assembly George Z. Erwin (a Morton man) moved that a majority of all Republican legislators should be necessary to nominate, not only a majority of those present, meaning that 48 votes were required instead of 46, which was carried by a vote of 52 to 39. The incumbent U.S. senator Warner Miller (Half-Breed faction) failed to be nominated by only four votes. Levi P. Morton (Stalwart faction) was rejected by the caucus, like in 1885. A small faction voted for Congressman Frank Hiscock. After the second ballot, Erwin moved to adjourn, which was carried by 48 to 43. The caucus met again on the next day, no choice was made in another two ballots. The caucus met again on January 19 after the joint ballot of the State Legislature, and after twelve more ballots, Erwin withdrew Morton's name and urged the Morton men to vote for Hiscock. On the next ballot Hiscock received one vote more than Miller (47 to 46), but was one short of the previously established majority of 48. On the 18th and last ballot, Hiscock received 50 votes and was nominated. On the next day, Hiscock was elected on the second joint ballot of the State Legislature. Thus, by blocking Miller's re-election, the Republican boss Thomas C. Platt took his revenge for his defeat at the special election in 1881.

The Democratic caucus nominated Smith Mead Weed (1834-1920), a lawyer and businessman of Plattsburgh, New York. Weed had been a member of the New York State Assembly from Clinton County, New York in 1865, 1866, 1867, 1871, 1873 and 1874; and a delegate to the 1876 and 1884 Democratic National Conventions.

Pennsylvania 

The election in Pennsylvania was held January 18, 1887. Matthew Quay was elected by the Pennsylvania General Assembly to the United States Senate. The General Assembly, consisting of the House of Representatives and Senate voted as follows:

|-
|-bgcolor="#EEEEEE"
| colspan="3" align="right" | Totals
| align="right" | 251
| align="right" | 100.00%
|}

See also 
 1886 United States elections
 1886 United States House of Representatives elections
 49th United States Congress
 50th United States Congress

Notes

References

Further reading